Luis Ángel Fernando de los Santos Grossi (8 June 1925 – 30 August 2010) was a Uruguayan cyclist. He competed at the 1948 and 1952 Summer Olympics. His best result was 4th with the Uruguayan team in the 4000 meters Team Pursuit at the 1948 Games.

References

External links
 

1925 births
2010 deaths
Uruguayan male cyclists
Olympic cyclists of Uruguay
Cyclists at the 1948 Summer Olympics
Cyclists at the 1952 Summer Olympics
Sportspeople from Montevideo